The Freedom Wall, located at the corner of Michigan Avenue and East Ferry Street in Buffalo, New York, is a mural depicting twenty-eight civil rights leaders active anytime from the 19th to the 21st centuries, ranging from William Wells Brown (born 1815) to Alicia Garza (born 1981). The project was commissioned by the Albright–Knox Art Gallery's Public Art Initiative in 2017, along with a 30-minute film of the same name about the mural. In 2019, WNED-TV broadcast the film about the mural.

History
Commissioned by Aaron Ott, the curator of the Albright–Knox Art Gallery's Public Art Initiative, the mural was initially intended to be Chuck Tingley alone, but following comments by the African-American community, African-American artists John Baker, Julia Bottoms and Edreys Wajed were also hired to work on the wall. Each artist completed seven panels of the mural, which took two months.

Mural
The mural depicts twenty-eight civil rights leaders, chosen from 300 suggestions. It is fifteen feet high and 300 feet long and located at the corner of Michigan Avenue and East Ferry Street in Buffalo, New York. The figures included are:

Actor George K. Arthur
Journalist and editor Al-Nisa Banks
Abolitionist and novelist William Wells Brown
Stokely Carmichael, who coined the term "Black Power"
Civil rights activist Mama Charlene Miller Caver
Congresswoman Shirley Chisholm
Academic and activist Angela Davis
Historian and activist W. E. B. Du Bois
Abolitionist Frederick Douglass
Historian Eva Doyle
Democratic politician Arthur O. Eve
Historian Monroe Fordham
Bus driver and activist Bill Gaiter
Journalist and leader Marcus Garvey

Black Lives Matter co-founder Alicia Garza
Politician Minnie Gillette
Women's suffrage activist Fannie Lou Hamer
Civil rights activist Martin Luther King Jr.
Civil rights activist Malcolm X
Lawyer Thurgood Marshall
Publisher Frank Merriweather
Reverend J. Edward Nash, Sr.
Black Panther Party co-founder Huey P. Newton
Activist Rosa Parks, known for the Montgomery bus boycott
Democratic politician King Peterson
Suffragist Mary Burnett Talbert
Abolitionist Harriet Tubman
Pediatrician Lydia T. Wright

References

External links 
How the Freedom Wall strengthened and developed the WNY Urban Arts Collective
In-progress 'Freedom Wall' turns heads, hearts on East Ferry
Albright-Knox debuts 'Freedom Wall'
'Freedom Wall' artists, People Inc. president to be honored
Afro-American history group to honor Freedom Wall artists

2010s murals
Murals in New York (state)
African-American art